William Wallace Campbell (June 10, 1806 – September 7, 1881) was an American author, historian, lawyer and politician from New York.

Life
He was born in Cherry Valley, Otsego County, New York, the son of Judge James S. Campbell, and grandson of American Revolutionary War Colonel Samuel Campbell and Jane Campbell. He attended the common schools, and graduated from Union College in 1827. He studied law, was admitted to the bar in 1831, and commenced practice in New York City.

He was elected on the American ticket to the 29th United States Congress, holding office from March 4, 1845, to March 3, 1847.

He was a justice of the Superior Court of New York City from 1849 to 1855. He was a justice of the New York Supreme Court from 1857 to 1865, and ex officio a judge of the New York Court of Appeals in 1865.

He was a Republican member of the New York State Assembly (Otsego Co., 1st D.) in 1869.

He was an author and engaged in historical work.  His works include:
The Border Warfare of New York During the Revolution: The Annals of Tryon County. New York: Baker & Schribner, 1831. (Reprint, Bowie, Md.: Heritage Books, 1992.)
An Historical Sketch of Robin Hood and Captain Kidd. New York: Scribner, 1853.
 The centennial celebration at Cherry Valley, Otsego Co. N.Y., July 4, 1840
 The addresses of William W. Campbell, esq. and Gov. W.H. Seward, with letters, toasts, &c., &c.''

He died on September 7, 1881, in Cherry Valley, and was buried at the Cherry Valley Cemetery.

New York State Surveyor General William Campbell was his uncle.

References

Sources

Obit of his brother John C. Campbell in NYT on March 27, 1890
Obit of his son Douglas Campbell (1839-1893) in NYT on March 8, 1893 (giving middle initial "M.")
Campbell genealogy at GeoCities
Campbell genealogy at RootsWeb
Political Graveyard (doubled entry)
Nominated for Assembly again in NYT on October 28, 1873
 Cover of: The centennial celebration at Cherry Valley, Otsego Co. N.Y., July 4th, 1840 by The centennial celebration at Cherry Valley, Otsego Co. N.Y., July 4th, 1840

1806 births
1881 deaths
People from Cherry Valley, New York
Know-Nothing members of the United States House of Representatives from New York (state)
Republican Party members of the New York State Assembly
New York Supreme Court Justices
19th-century American historians
19th-century American male writers
Judges of the New York Court of Appeals
Union College (New York) alumni
19th-century American politicians
Historians from New York (state)
19th-century American judges
American male non-fiction writers